Ashlyn Pearce (born July 8, 1994) is an American actress known for playing Alexandria Forrester on the popular CBS daytime soap The Bold and the Beautiful. Pearce joined the cast of Bold and the Beautiful in 2013 and exited the series in 2015.

Filmography

Awards and nominations

References

External links
 

1994 births
Living people
American actresses
21st-century American women